Pedro de Lencastre, or Peter of Lencastre (Azeitão, 1608 – Lisbon, 1673), was the youngest son of Álvaro and Juliana of Lencastre, 3rd Dukes of Aveiro.

He studied theology in the University of Coimbra and he became successively Bishop of Guarda, Archbishop of Évora and Archbishop of Braga.

In spite of the Portuguese revolution against the Spanish Habsburgs, his nephew, Raimundo of Lencastre, 4th Duke of Aveiro actively supported the rights of the Habsburg Kings and, in 1663, the new King of the Braganza Dynasty, John IV, decided to confiscate the Dukedom.

However, Peter of Lencastre, a Braganza supporter, requested the cancellation of this decision and, finally in 1668, he was recognised as 5th Duke of Aveiro and Marquis of Torres Novas.

Later the same year, when the peace between Portugal and Spain was signed, Peter's niece, Maria de Guadalupe of Lencastre, sister and heir of the 4th Duke, requested the cancellation of the decision that granted the Dukedom of Aveiro to her uncle, in order to obtain it for herself.

Due to Peter of Lencastre's death in 1673, Maria de Guadalupe of Lencastre, still living in Spain, was recognised as the new Duchess of Aveiro on condition she would return to Portugal.

See also
Infante George of Lencastre
Duke of Aveiro
Marquis of Torres Novas

External links
 Genealogy of Peter of Lencastre, 5th Duke of Aveiro, in Portuguese

Bibliography
 ”Nobreza de Portugal e do Brasil" – Vol. II, page 345. Published by Zairol Lda., Lisbon 1989.

105
Portuguese nobility
1608 births
1673 deaths
University of Coimbra alumni
17th-century Portuguese people
People from Setúbal